Dana Olmert (born December 26, 1972), is an Israeli left wing activist, literary theorist and editor. She is a daughter of Israel's former Prime Minister Ehud Olmert.

Olmert graduated with a PhD in literature from the Hebrew University of Jerusalem on "The Growth of Hebrew Poetry by Women During the Twenties: Psychoanalytical and Feminist Perspectives." She teaches literature at Tel Aviv University and lately teaches creative writing workshops. She is the editor of a poetry series and was invited to several juries of literary prizes.

She volunteered for Machsom Watch. In June 2006, she attended a march in Tel Aviv protesting alleged Israeli complicity in the Gaza beach blast which made her the subject of criticism from right-wing personalities.

Olmert is a lesbian and defends the Pride parade in Israel. She lives with her partner, Dafna Ben-Zvi, in Tel Aviv.The couple have a daughter.

References 

1972 births
Living people
Jewish feminists
Israeli activists
Israeli feminists
Israeli women activists
Literary theorists
Lesbian feminists
Israeli lesbian writers
Lesbian Jews
Israeli LGBT rights activists
Israeli Ashkenazi Jews
Academic staff of Tel Aviv University
Hebrew University of Jerusalem alumni
21st-century Israeli women politicians
Children of prime ministers of Israel
Women civil rights activists
21st-century LGBT people
Jewish women activists
Dana